Dungeon of Death is a fantasy role-playing video game developed by Instant Software. The game was released on the 8K Commodore PET.

Plot
Dungeon of Death is a game in which the player searches a 12-level dungeon for the Holy Grail.

Reception
The game was reviewed in The Dragon #44 by Mark Herro.  Herro described the game as "one of the many quasi-D&D programs on the market" at the time. He also stated that "Dungeon of Death provides "a 'cheap and dirty' fix" for the solitary game player.

Reviews
Creative Computing

References

1970s horror video games
1979 video games
Commodore PET games
Commodore PET-only games
Fantasy video games
Instant Software games
Role-playing video games
Video games developed in the United States